Mohammad Ishraque is an Indian politician and a member of the Sixth Legislative Assembly of Delhi in India. He represents the Seelampur constituency of New Delhi and is a member of the Aam Aadmi Party political party.

Early life and education
Mohammad Ishraque was born in Hapur. He has not received any formal education and has attended Madarsa till fifth grade.

Political career
Mohammad Ishraque has been a MLA for one term. He represented the Seelampur constituency and is a member of the Aam Aadmi Party political party.

Posts held

See also
Aam Aadmi Party
Delhi Legislative Assembly
Government of India
Politics of India
Seelampur (Delhi Assembly constituency)
Sixth Legislative Assembly of Delhi

References 

1961 births
Delhi MLAs 2015–2020
Living people
People from New Delhi
Aam Aadmi Party MLAs from Delhi